Antti Lehtonen, (born August 6, 1993) is a Finnish professional ice hockey goaltender. He is currently a free agent having last played for Ilves of the Finnish Liiga.

Lehtonen made his Liiga debut playing with Oulun Kärpät during the 2015–16 Liiga season.

References

External links

1993 births
Living people
Finnish ice hockey goaltenders
Hokki players
Ilves players
JYP-Akatemia players
KOOVEE players
Lempäälän Kisa players
Sportspeople from Jyväskylä
21st-century Finnish people